Clupeosoma margarisemale is a moth in the family Crambidae. It was described by Eugene G. Munroe in 1977. It is found on Java in Indonesia.

References

Moths described in 1977
Odontiinae